Robertas Poškus (born 5 May 1979) is a Lithuanian professional football manager and a former player.

Career

Club 
In 15 years he left for Germany, played there for several years for the team of Hamburger SV. From 2002 to 2005 he appeared in the FC Krylia Sovetov Samara "Wings of the Soviets". 30 June 2003, played for the team of foreign players of the Russian championship. In the summer of 2005 he moved to FC Zenit Saint Petersburg. In February 2009, he moved to FC Ural Sverdlovsk Oblast [2], serving in the First Division of Russia [2], which included 12 matches and scored 2 goals, after which, on 21 August, he was discarded [3]. In the 2009/10 season he became the champion of Azerbaijan in the Inter Baku. In the 2012/13 season, played for FC Sibir Novosibirsk.
Since 2013 – the head coach of the club "Klaipedos Granitas", performing in the First League of Lithuania.

Managerial
In June 2017, Poškus became the head coach of the Amkar Perm youth team.

Career statistics

Club

International

Statistics accurate as of match played 11 October 2011

International goals

Honours
Kareda Siauliai
 Lithuanian Football Cup: 1999
Polonia Warsaw
 Polish Cup: 2001
Krylia Sovetov Samara
 Lithuanian Footballer of the Year: 2003
Inter Baku
 Azerbaijan Premier League: 2009–10

References

External links
Profile on Inter Baku's Official Site
 

1979 births
Living people
Lithuanian footballers
Lithuania international footballers
Lithuanian expatriate footballers
FK Atlantas players
A Lyga players
Hamburger SV players
Hamburger SV II players
FK Žalgiris players
Widzew Łódź players
Polonia Warsaw players
PFC Krylia Sovetov Samara players
Russian Premier League players
FC Zenit Saint Petersburg players
FC Dynamo Moscow players
FC Rostov players
Bnei Sakhnin F.C. players
FC Ural Yekaterinburg players
Shamakhi FK players
FC Sibir Novosibirsk players
Expatriate footballers in Russia
Expatriate footballers in Germany
Expatriate footballers in Israel
Expatriate footballers in Azerbaijan
Expatriate footballers in Poland
Lithuanian expatriate sportspeople in Poland
FK Kareda Kaunas players
Association football forwards
Lithuanian football managers
FK Jonava managers
Lithuanian expatriate football managers
Expatriate football managers in Russia